Michał Tyszkiewicz or Mykolas Tiškevičius is the name of several members of the Polish–Lithuanian noble Tyszkiewicz family:

 Michał Tyszkiewicz (envoy) (16th century), envoy to the Crimean Khanate
 Michał Tyszkiewicz (1761–1839), polkovnik, purchased manors in Palanga and Biržai
 Michał Tyszkiewicz (Egyptologist) (1828–1897), collector of antiques and amateur Egyptologist
 Michał Stanisławowicz Tyszkiewicz (1857–1930), Ukrainian cultural activist, diplomat for the Ukrainian People's Republic
 Michał Zygmunt Tyszkiewicz (1903–1974), diplomat and songwriter